Almenno San Bartolomeo (Bergamasque:  or simply ) is a comune (municipality) in the Province of Bergamo in the Italian region Lombardy, located about  northeast of Milan and about  northwest of Bergamo.

Almenno San Bartolomeo borders the following municipalities: Almè, Almenno San Salvatore, Barzana, Brembate di Sopra, Paladina, Palazzago, Roncola, Strozza, Valbrembo.

The main sight is the Rotonda of San Tomè.

References

Articles which contain graphical timelines